Zula ግእዝ ዙላ saba ሰብኣ 𐩸𐩡  is a small town in central Eritrea. It is situated near the head of Annesley Bay (also known as the Gulf of Zula), on the Red Sea coast.  Four kilometers away is the archeological site of Adulis, which was an emporium and the port of Axum.

History
The Eritrean Research Project Team composed of Eritrean, Canadian, American, Dutch and French scientists discovered a Paleolithic site with stone and obsidian tools dated to over 125,000 years old near the Bay of Zula south of Massawa, along the Red Sea littoral. The tools are believed to have been used by early humans to harvest marine resources like clams and oysters.

The Kingdom of Aksum was a powerful trading empire centered in northern Ethiopia and Eritrea. It existed from approximately 100–940 AD, growing from the proto-Aksumite D'mt, of the Iron Age period c. 4th century BC to achieve prominence by the 1st century AD.

An important trade route led from Adulis, then on the coast, to the capital of the kingdom, Aksum, located in the Tigray Region of Ethiopia.

In 1857, an agreement was entered into by the Dejazmach of Tigray, in revolt against Emperor Tewodros II of Ethiopia, to cede Zula to the French. Agew Niguse was defeated by Emperor Tewodros, and the commander of a French cruiser sent to Annesley Bay in 1859 found the country in a state of anarchy. No further steps were taken by France to assert its sovereignty, and Zula with the neighbouring coast passed, nominally, to Egypt in 1866.  Zula was the place where the British expedition of 1867 – 1868 against Tewodros disembarked, Annesley Bay affording safe and ample anchorage for the largest ocean-going vessels.  A road was built by the British from Zula to Senafe in the Eritrean Highlands.

The authority of Egypt having lapsed over Zula, an Italian protectorate was proclaimed in 1888, and in 1890 the town was incorporated into the colony of Eritrea.

Geography
Zula is a village and port on the Red Sea in central Eritrea. The coast here is lined with mangroves, and there is an aircraft landing strip  to the north.

At Zula, the remains of the railway tracks, laid by Napier's Expedition to haul his heavy equipment ashore, can still be seen.

References

Aksumite cities
Populated places in Eritrea